Arlette Zola is a singer who represented Switzerland in the Eurovision Song Contest 1982. She was born Arlette Jaquet in the city of Fribourg on 29 April 1949. Her song, "Amour on t'aime", was an upbeat number. Zola was placed third behind Germany and Israel. She made two further attempts at reaching the Eurovision finals. In 1984, she took third place in the Swiss final with Emporte-moi. 1985 also saw her in third spot, this time with Aime-moi, performed with Helder and the Heldernauts.

An early Arlette Zola song, "Je suis folle de tant d'aimer", dating back to the 1960s, can be heard on the CD Swinging Mademoiselles.

Discography 
1965 Un peu d'amour, Libéria
1966 Elles sont coquines, Disc AZ
1967 Arlette Zola, Disc AZ
1967 Deux garçons pour une fille, Disc AZ
1967 J n'aime que vous. Disc AZ
1968 Musique en tête, Disc AZ LP
1969 C'est toute la terre, Disc Concert Hall LP
1969 La marchande de bonbon, Vogue
1970 L'été, Vogue
1971 Je suis folle de tant t'aimer, Vogue
1972 Pour que vienne enfin ce grand matin, Evasion
1977 Tu inventais des saisons, Tourel
1980 Offre moi un sourire, Libéria
1981 Frappe dans tes mains, Libéria
1981 Les fiancés du lac de Côme, LP Libéria
1982 Amour on t'aime, LP Jupiter Records
1982 Je n'ai pas changé, LP Jupiter Records
1983 Billy Boogie, LP Vogue
1984 Hasta manana amore mio, Disc Ibach
1990 Mais moi je l'aime, Libéria
2003 Laissez-moi encore chanter, Azo
2005 Amour... Amitié, Azo
2007 Le bonheur ne coûte rien, Azo
2009 Souvenir, mes anées 6o

External links
Discography
Fansite with Diskografie
60. Anniversary

1949 births
Living people
People from Fribourg
Eurovision Song Contest entrants of 1982
Eurovision Song Contest entrants for Switzerland
20th-century Swiss women singers
English-language singers from Switzerland
French-language singers of Switzerland
21st-century Swiss women singers